Clarksville Independent School District is a rural public school district in Red River County, Texas (USA) and serves all students in the town of Clarksville and small portions of nearby communities. Approximately 690 students were enrolled for the Fall 2011 semester.

In 2009, the school district was rated "academically acceptable" by the Texas Education Agency. 
In 2010, the high school as well as the District received a rating of ""recognized" by the Texas Education Agency.

Schools

Clarksville ISD operates four campuses, including Clarksville High School (grades 9-12), Cheatham Middle School (grades 6-8), Clarksville Elementary School (grades K-5), and the Vocational School/DAEP.

2012-13 Administration
Pam Bryant serves as Superintendent of Schools. After 33 years of service to Clarksville ISD in various capacities such as teacher, principal, special programs director, and assistant superintendent, Bryant was named CEO for the District in 2007.

References

External links
 Official Website

School districts in Red River County, Texas